Gornji Breg is a village in Serbia. The village has a Hungarian ethnic majority and its population numbering 1,889 people (2002 census). Number of inhabitants is constantly decreasing.

Geography
It is located on the right bank of the River Tisa in northern Bačka. It lays 4 kilometres west from the town of Senta and about 7 kilometres from the river on the Senta—Subotica railway.

History
The oldest reliable information about the village dates from 1738, when it was under Austrian rule, administratively part of the Military Frontier. The local church was built in 1890. During the 1960s and 1970s the village was urbanized and a nursery school was built.

It is one of the newer settlements in the region, since the space where this village was located was abandoned for a long time after Ottoman rule had ended. The Hungarian population that settled here came from Dorozsma, and Felsőmegye, which are located in modern-day Hungary. The first settlers had planted the hills with grapes and fruit trees, hence they named it Felsőszőlőhegy. After the desolation of grapes, the name of the settlement was shortened into Felsőhegy.

Economy
The main occupation of the resident population is agriculture. The majority deals with vegetables and market gardening as well as glasshouse culture.

Culture and events
The local church is dedicated to Saint Joseph and there is a high mass, organized in May every year to celebrate the said Saint. Beside the church's feast day, there is an annual fair throughout the village, which also attracts the surrounding towns and villages. There is a primary school “Csokonai Vitéz Mihály” across the church. Near school, there is a community centre, where different programmes and ceremonies are held every year.

Every year, the village organizes a harvesting festival which gathers a lot of people, some of them even from abroad. There are many different sport events during the day and when the evening comes, there is a "Harvester’s Ball". The other illustrious festival is the Shearer Festival. This event gathers a lot of people too and there is a great cooking contest where you can taste the delicious lamb stew.

Demographics

According to the last census it has 1889 inhabitants. 97,14% of the population is of Hungarian nationality, 1,27% have Serbian nationality and 1,59% of the population claim they have other nationalities. It is mostly an ethnic Hungarian village and all of the population speaks Hungarian language fluently. Gornji Breg has 1497 adult citizens. The average age of the inhabitants is approximately 40 years. The village has 739 households with an average of 2,56 members per house.

Other village characteristics
There’s a park behind the school where you can find a playground which was built several years ago. Beside these, there is a sanitary office, three shops, two bakeries a nice mill and two agricultural co-operations. There is not much to see in the village, since there are no official sights.

See also
List of places in Serbia
List of cities, towns and villages in Vojvodina
Official website of Senta

Famous people 
Fajka Zsóka
Places in Bačka
Senta